Mary Ann Glendon (born October 7, 1938) is the Learned Hand Professor of Law at Harvard Law School and a former United States Ambassador to the Holy See. She teaches and writes on bioethics, comparative constitutional law, property, and human rights in international law. She supports government bans on abortion services and "writes forcefully against the expansion of abortion rights."

Early life
Glendon was raised in Dalton, Massachusetts. Her father, Martin Glendon, an Irish-Catholic Democrat, was a reporter for the Berkshire Eagle and also chaired the local board of selectmen.

Career
Glendon received her Bachelor of Arts, Juris Doctor, and Master of Comparative Law from the University of Chicago.

Glendon practiced law in Chicago from 1963 to 1968. She became a professor at Boston College Law School in 1968 and began teaching at Harvard Law School in 1987.

In 1995, she was the Vatican representative to the international 1995 Beijing Conference on Women sponsored by the United Nations, where she contested the use of condoms for the prevention of HIV and AIDS. At the time, Pope John Paul II issued a statement that "The Holy See in no way endorses contraception or the use of condoms, either as a family planning measure or in HIV/AIDS prevention programs."

On November 4, 2002, in reference to the Boston Globe'''s Pulitzer Prize nomination for its coverage of sexual abuse by Catholic priests, Glendon told a conference of Catholics that "if fairness and accuracy have anything to do with it, awarding the Pulitzer Prize to the Boston Globe would be like giving the Nobel Peace Prize to Osama bin Laden." In 2003 the Globe was awarded the Pulitzer Prize for Public Service for its coverage of the church scandals.Glendon was appointed by President Bush to the President's Council on Bioethics. Her nomination as United States Ambassador to the Holy See was announced on November 5, 2007. The U.S. Senate voted to confirm her on December 19, 2007. She presented her Letters of Credence to Pope Benedict XVI on February 29, 2008, and resigned her office effective January 19, 2009.

On June 26, 2013 Pope Francis named Glendon a member of the Pontifical Commission of inquiry for the Institute for Works of Religion (IOR), which is also known as the Vatican Bank. Glendon, two cardinals, a bishop, and a monsignor are responsible for preparing an investigative report on the Vatican Bank. In July 2014 she was appointed to be a member of the board of the IOR.
Glendon resigned from the board in February 2018 saying that she wanted to devote more time to other Catholic causes.

Glendon serves on the board of directors for First Things'', an ecumenical conservative journal that encourages a religiously informed philosophy for the ordering of society. She is also a board member of Blackstone Fellowship the Christian conservative legal training program run by Alliance Defending Freedom.

On October 1, 2017, it was announced that Glendon would be the 2018 recipient of the Notre Dame Center for Ethics and Culture's Evangelium Vitae Medal.

Politics

During the 1960 presidential election, the first in which Glendon could vote, she cast her ballot for John F. Kennedy. For most of her early life she was a Democrat.

Glendon supported Mitt Romney in the 2012 presidential election. She also supported Romney's campaign in the 2008 presidential election.

Glendon was a mentor of Mike Pompeo, the former United States Secretary of State, when Pompeo was at Harvard Law School.

Pompeo appointed Glendon as Chair of the newly formed State Department's Commission on Unalienable Rights in July 2019 to re-examine the role of human rights in U.S. foreign policy.

Notre Dame controversy
Glendon was selected by the University of Notre Dame as the 2009 recipient of the school's Laetare Medal but declined the award due to the university's  decision to host Barack Obama as its commencement speaker and bestow upon him an honorary degree, which was seen as controversial by some. In light of Obama's pro-choice policies, Glendon considered Notre Dame's decision to be in violation of the United States Conference of Catholic Bishops' 2004 pronouncement that Catholic institutions should not give "awards, honors, or platforms" to "those who act in defiance of [Catholic] fundamental moral principles."  Glendon also felt that the university was implicitly trying to use her acceptance speech to give the appearance of balance to the event and expressed concern about the "ripple effect" Notre Dame's disregard of the USCCB pronouncement is having on the nation's other Catholic schools.

Personal life
In 1964 Glendon contracted a civil marriage with an attorney and settled in Chicago. They divorced in 1966. In 1970 she married Edward R. Lev, a labor lawyer. Glendon and Lev remained together until Lev's death in 2013. Glendon has three daughters.

See also
 George W. Bush Supreme Court candidates

References

External links 
 Harvard Law School: Learned Hand Professor of Law Mary Ann Glendon
 The Marian Library: Holy See's Final Statement at Women's Conference in Beijing
 University of Navarra: Mary Ann Glendon awarded the title of Doctor Honoris Causa by the University of Navarra (in Spanish)
 The Pope's New Feminism. March 1, 1997.
 Ecclesia in America: Reform, Renewal and the Role of the Laity in a Time of Turbulence. November 4, 2002.
 
 

1938 births
21st-century American diplomats
Alliance Defending Freedom people
Ambassadors of the United States to the Holy See
American anti-abortion activists
American women ambassadors
American women lawyers
American lawyers
Catholic philosophers
Catholics from Massachusetts
Family law scholars
Harvard Law School faculty
Living people
Massachusetts Republicans
Members of the Pontifical Academy of Social Sciences
National Humanities Medal recipients
People from Dalton, Massachusetts
People from Pittsfield, Massachusetts
University of Chicago Law School alumni
American women legal scholars
American legal scholars